Hungarian Open may refer to:

 Hungarian Open (darts)
 Hungarian Open (table tennis)
 Hungarian Open (tennis), an ATP World Tour event
 Hungarian Challenger Open, an ATP Challenger Tour event
 Hungarian Ladies Open, a WTA Tour event
 Hungarian Open, a tournament in the European Poker Tour

See also
 Hungarian Opening, an opening in Chess
 Hungarian Open Air Museum